Cristóbal Martín de Herrera (Aldeadávila de la Ribera, Spain, 29 March 1831 - Madrid, Spain, 1878) was a Spanish politician who served as Ministry of Public Works in the reign of Alfonso XII.

References 

1831 births
1878 deaths
Justice ministers of Spain